The 2008 Mojo Honours List Winners were announced at a ceremony at The Brewery in London, England on 16 June 2008.

Nominees
Complete list of nominees (winners in bold):

Song of the Year
LCD Soundsystem - "All My Friends"
Nick Cave and the Bad Seeds - "Dig, Lazarus, Dig!!!"
The Last Shadow Puppets - "The Age of the Understatement"
Richard Hawley - "Tonight the Streets Are Ours"
Duffy - "Mercy"
Best Live Act
Arctic Monkeys
Rufus Wainwright
Seasick Steve
Led Zeppelin
Neil Young
Outstanding Contribution to Music
Paul Weller
Icon Award
Sex Pistols
Classic Songwriter
Neil Diamond
Best Breakthrough Act
Duffy
Foals
Pete Molinari
The Last Shadow Puppets
Bon Iver
Best Album Award
Nick Cave and the Bad Seeds - Dig, Lazarus, Dig!!!
Arctic Monkeys - Favourite Worst Nightmare
Radiohead - In Rainbows
Duffy - Rockferry
Robert Plant and Alison Krauss - Raising Sand
Hero Award
Motörhead
Hall of Fame
The Specials
Lifetime Achievement Award
Genesis
Special Award
Judy Collins
Legend Award
Irma Thomas
Classic Album Award
My Bloody Valentine for Loveless
Inspiration Award
John Fogerty
Roots Award
Toots Hibbert
Les Paul Award
John Martyn
Maverick Award
Mark E. Smith
Vision Award
Julien Temple for The Future is Unwritten
Compilation of the Year
Theme Time Radio Hour With Your Host Bob Dylan
The Very Best of Ethiopiques: Hypnotic Grooves from the Legendary Series
Cries From the Midnight Circus: The Ladbroke Grove Scene 1968 - 1971
From the Motion Picture Control
Juno Original Soundtrack
Catalogue Release of the Year
Pillows & Prayers

References

External links
Mojo magazine

Mojo
Mojo
Mojo
Mojo
Mojo
British music awards